Agnes Fleischer (6 February 1865 – 15 September 1909) was a Norwegian pioneering teacher for disabled persons. She was born in Christiania, and the sister of Nanna Fleischer. She suffered herself from a serious hip and back disease, and with help form her sister, and funds from their father, the two sisters established a school for disabled persons in 1892. 

The school was the basis for the institution Sophies Minde, established in 1897 from grants from King Oscar II and Queen Sophie. 

Agnes and Nanna Fleischer were both awarded King Oscar II's Medal in gold in 1905. Agnes died in 1909, 44 years old.

References

1865 births
1909 deaths
Norwegian schoolteachers